Peter Douglas Blacker (born 20 October 1941) is a former Australian politician who represented the seat of Flinders in the South Australian House of Assembly for the Nationals SA from 1973 to 1993. During that time he was the only Nationals member in the South Australian parliament.

As of 2017, Blacker is a member of the Country Health SA Local Health Network Health Advisory Council, and a former Chair of the Regional Communities Consultative Council.

References

National Party of Australia members of the Parliament of South Australia
1941 births
Living people
Members of the South Australian House of Assembly